Juris Sokolovskis (transcribed: Yuriy Nikolayevich Sokolovskiy) (born June 13, 1976, in Riga) is a Latvian lawyer and politician, member of the 7th, 8th and 9th Saeima, and co-chairman of ForHRUL from 2007 to 2011.

Biography
1996 — Sokolovskis takes part in founding the Equal Rights party and joins the Latvian Human Rights Committee.

1998 — Sokolovskis is elected to the 7th Saeima, becoming the youngest MP in Saeima's history.

1999 — Sokolovskis achieves a bachelor's degree in law.

2001 — Sokolovskis achieves a master's degree in law.

2002 — Sokolovskis is re-elected to Saeima.

2003 March—June — Sokolovskis becomes head of ForHRUL group in the Saeima.

2004 May—June — Sokolovskis temporarily serves as MEP from Latvia.

Since 2005 — Sokolovskis serves as the co-chairman of ForHRUL youth organization.

2006 — Sokolovskis is re-elected to the Saeima (serving until 2010).

2007—2011 — Sokolovskis served as co-chairman of ForHRUL.

External links
Personal data on Saeima's website 7th, 8th, 9th convocation

1976 births
Living people
Lawyers from Riga
Latvian people of Russian descent
Equal Rights (Latvia) politicians
Latvian Russian Union politicians
Deputies of the 7th Saeima
Deputies of the 8th Saeima
Deputies of the 9th Saeima
Latvian Russian Union MEPs
MEPs 1999–2004
Politicians from Riga
21st-century Latvian lawyers